Francisco Tomás Rodríguez Montero (born 5 November 1943) is a Mexican politician affiliated with the PRD. As of 2013 he served as Deputy of the LXII Legislature of the Mexican Congress representing Morelos.

References

1943 births
Living people
Politicians from Morelos
People from Cuautla
Party of the Democratic Revolution politicians
21st-century Mexican politicians
20th-century Mexican politicians
Members of the Congress of Morelos
Mexican civil engineers
Municipal presidents in Morelos
Deputies of the LXII Legislature of Mexico
Members of the Chamber of Deputies (Mexico) for Morelos